The Austrian National Cyclo-cross Championships are held annually to decide the Austrian cycling champions in the cyclo-cross discipline, across various categories.

Men

Women

See also
Austrian National Road Race Championships
Austrian National Time Trial Championships

References

Cycle races in Austria
Recurring sporting events established in 1962
1962 establishments in Austria
National cyclo-cross championships